The parotias are a genus, Parotia, of passerine birds in the bird-of-paradise family Paradisaeidae. They are endemic to New Guinea. They are also known as six-plumed birds of paradise, due to their six head quills.  These birds were featured prominently in the BBC series Planet Earth.

The males of the genus are characterized by an ornamental plumage consisting of six wired head plumes with black oval-shaped tips, a neck collar of black, decomposed feathers which can be spread into a skirt-like shape, and bright or iridescent head and throat markings. During courtship, they perform ballerina-like dances and spread out their "skirt" on a patch of forest floor they have meticulously cleaned of dead leaves and other debris. The "ballerina dances" usually consist of the male hopping from foot and bobbing their heads from side to side.  The males are polygamous and do not take part in raising the young. Clutch size is somewhat uncertain; it is usually one to three eggs.

Taxonomy 
The genus name is composed of par, meaning "near" and Ancient Greek  ōtos for "ear", specifically meaning "curl of hair by the ear", referring to six head plumes on each side of the head, characteristic to male birds of this genus.

Species 
 Western parotia, Parotia sefilata
 Carola's parotia, Parotia carolae
 Bronze parotia, Parotia berlepschi
 Lawes's parotia, Parotia lawesii
 Eastern parotia, Parotia helenae
 Wahnes's parotia, Parotia wahnesi

References

 Mackay, Margaret D. (1990): The Egg of Wahnes' Parotia Parotia wahnesi (Paradisaeidae). Emu 90(4): 269. 
 Scholes III, Edwin (2008): Evolution of the courtship phenotype in the bird of paradise genus Parotia (Aves: Paradisaeidae): homology, phylogeny, and modularity. Biological Journal of the Linnean Society 94: 491–504.

 
Bird genera
 
 
Taxa named by Louis Jean Pierre Vieillot